WQHS is the only wholly student-operated college radio station at the University of Pennsylvania. WXPN was the University's principal student radio station until 1975, with WQHS as an AM-based training ground for DJs. After 1975, WQHS became the official student radio station of the University, with WXPN being taken over by an external company. The radio station currently broadcasts an eclectic freeform radio format over internet radio, as a result of their radio tower, formerly on top of Harnwell College House, falling down in a severe storm in 2003.

History
In the 1960s, the University had two radio stations with the call sign WXPN, an FM station at 88.9 MHz and an AM station at 730 KHz.  The AM radio station broadcast as a non-licensed carrier current radio station, and able to be heard only on the University grounds. Both radio stations consisted of educational programming, news and sports coverage, as well as music. In 1965, WXPN-AM started airing popular music shows, stirring interest among the students. At the time, the radio station operated out of Houston Hall, directly in the center of campus.

In 1970, operations moved to a larger, more private location, at 3905 Spruce Street. After problems with the FCC over show content in the 1970s, WXPN-FM's broadcast license wasn't renewed. WXPN-AM then became WQHS, which stands for Quad Hill Superblock (referring to student dormitories on campus).  As it had not been involved with the FCC dispute, WQHS remained completely student-run while WXPN was afterwards run by a mix of community volunteers and former students. The stations developed two distinct styles, with WQHS focused more on contemporary music and WXPN reflecting the more esoteric interests of its staff.  This ultimately led to a complete split between the stations, with both moving from their common Spruce Street location. WQHS is now located on the third floor of the Hollenback Center, on the far east side of campus.

External links
WQHS HomePage
How To Lose Your Station’s FCC License (Retrieved 2 June 2021)

University of Pennsylvania
QHS
QHS
Internet radio stations in the United States
Defunct radio stations in the United States
Radio stations established in 1975
Radio stations disestablished in 2003
1975 establishments in Pennsylvania